Parameswaran Thankappan Nair is an Indian scientist, independent researcher, historian and Malayali author based in Kolkata, India, who has written extensively on the history of Calcutta in the English language. He has published 61 books, with 62nd book titled "Gandhiji in Kolkata" to be published soon.

Personal life

PT was born in Manjapra near Kalady, Kerala in Changanattuveettil.

Career and research on Calcutta
After passing his matriculation in Alwaye, Kerala, he arrived in Calcutta in September 1955 in the Madras Mail. He earned a BA and LLB at the University of Calcutta, and had started out as a typist at a salary of Rs 125. As the subject of the city was largely unexplored, he chose to write on the city, and spent the next five decades researching and writing on it as a hobby.

As an outsider, his work dealt extensively with perspectives overlooked by institutional, and nationalist historians in India. In so doing he has extensively examined British social life in Calcutta, the history of Calcutta High Court, the city's taverns and hotels, and the city's south Indian diaspora.

TP was the owner of large collection of rare books.  It was told that the Oxford Library at the University of Oxford sent him a blank cheque for buying those books on behalf of the library.  But he chose to donate it to the Calcutta Town Hall Society.

He was honoured by Burdwan University with a D.Litt. degree.

In 1991 he announced the 300th anniversary of Calcutta city through his research.

Often known as the barefoot historian of Calcutta, he still uses his 1964 Remington typewriter  and lives at 82C, Kansari Road, Bhavanipur, South Kolkata.

Awards
 Honorary D.Litt. from the University of Burdwan
 Senior research professor at the Asiatic Society.

Selected books
First Circulating and College Libraries of Calcutta (2012)
Kalakātā āche kalakātātei (in Bengali) (2009)
Origin of the Kolkata Police (2007)
B.S. Kesavan: First National Librarian of India (2005)
South Indians in Kolkata: History of Kannadigas, Konkanis, Malayalees, Tamilians, Telugus, South Indian Dishes and Tippoo Sultan's Heirs in Calcutta (2004)
John Alexander Chapman: Selections from the Works of a Lover of India (2004)
Echoes from Belvedere: Home of National Library, Kolkata (2004)
Hicky and his Gazette (2001)
The Mango in Indian Life and Culture (1995)
Calcutta Tercentenary Bibliography Volumes 1 & 2 (1993)
British Beginnings in Bengal, 1600-1660 (1991)
James Prinsep: Life and Work - Volume 1 (1991)
Job Charnock: The Founder of Calcutta: an Anthology (1990)
Calcutta Bevy: A Collection of Rare Poems (1989)
Calcutta Municipal Corporation at a Glance (1989)
Indian National Songs and Symbols (1987)
A History of Calcutta's Streets (1987)
A History of the Calcutta Press, the Beginnings (1987)
Rainey's a Historical and Topographical Sketch of Calcutta (edited work of H. James Rainey) (1986)
Calcutta in the Seventeenth Century (1986)
Calcutta: Origin of the Name (1985)
 Bruton's Visit to Lord Jagannatha 350 years ago (edited work of William Bruton) (1985)
Tribes of Arunachal Pradesh (1985)
Calcutta in the 18th Century (1984)
British Social Life in Ancient Calcutta: 1750 to 1850 (1983)
Marriage and Dowry in India (1978)
The Peacock: The National Bird of India (1977)

References

1933 births
Living people
20th-century Indian historians
People from Aluva
Scientists from Kolkata
Malayali people
University of Calcutta alumni
Scientists from Kerala